Macri or Macrì is a surname. Notable people with the surname include:

Antonio Macrì (ca. 1902 – 1975), Italian leader of the 'Ndrangheta
Dumitru Macri (born 1931), Romanian footballer
 Federica Macrì (born 1990), Italian artistic gymnast
Franco Macri (1930-2019), Italian-Argentine businessman
 Giuseppina Macrì (born 1974), Italian judoka
Laura Macrì (born 1990), Italian singer
Matt Macri (born 1982), American baseball player
Mauricio Macri (born 1959), Former President of Argentina
Teresa Macrì (born 1960), Italian art critic, curator and writer

See also
 Macri (Titular see)
 Makri (disambiguation)

Italian-language surnames